Henry Byron McCulloch (24 July 1877 – 5 May 1962) was a Liberal party member of the House of Commons of Canada. He was born in Lower Stewiacke, Nova Scotia and became a merchant by career working at various companies such as Standard Clay Producers, Victorial Coal Company Ltd., and Maritime Steel Foundries.

He was first elected to Parliament at the Pictou riding in the 1935 general election then re-elected for successive terms in 1940, 1945, 1949 and 1953. McCulloch was defeated at Pictou by Russell MacEwan of the Progressive Conservative party in the 1957 election.

One important post he held was the chairmanship of the House of Commons committee on railroads, canals, and telegraph lines.

Although a long-time MP, he never made a speech in Parliament until his final year, when he asked for federal and provincial aid to save the community of Westville, Nova Scotia, from becoming a ghost town.

Electoral history

References

External links
 

1877 births
1962 deaths
Canadian merchants
Members of the House of Commons of Canada from Nova Scotia
Liberal Party of Canada MPs